David Andrew Millar is a Canadian former politician, who represented the electoral district of Klondike in the Yukon Legislative Assembly from 1992 to 1996.

He was a member of the Yukon Party.

References

1955 births
Living people
Politicians from Whitehorse
Yukon Party MLAs